Cho Jae-wan (born 29 August 1995) is a South Korean footballer who plays as forward for Gangwon FC.

Career
Cho joined K League 2 side Seoul E-Land FC before 2018 season starts.

Club
As of 10 October 2021

References

1995 births
Living people
Association football forwards
South Korean footballers
Seoul E-Land FC players
Gangwon FC players
K League 1 players
K League 2 players
People from Changwon
Sportspeople from South Gyeongsang Province